Lev Georgievich Prygunov (born 23 April 1939, Alma-Ata, Kazakh SSR) is a Russian actor, painter, People's Artist of Russia (2013). His son is a Russian film director .

After graduation, he studied for two years at the biological faculty of the Alma-Ata Pedagogical Institute. In 1962 he graduated from the Leningrad Institute of Theater, Music and Cinematography (Tatyana Georgievna Soinikova's course).

Filmography
 1962 – Shore Leave
 1964 – Attack and Retreat
 1965 – I Am Twenty
 1965 – Children of Don Quixote
 1965 – Going Inside a Storm
 1969 – Bonivur's Heart
 1970 – Between the High Bread
 1970 – Chetirimata ot Vagona 
 1970 – Liberation
 1975 – How the Steel Was Tempered
 1976 – Fatherless
 1977 – Born to Revolution
 1978 – The Tavern on Pyatnitskaya
 1979 – Search Wind
 1979 – Shot in the Back
 1980 – Dangerous Friends
 1983 – Love. Waiting. Lena
 1983 – Anxious Sunday
 1984 – Charlotte Necklace
 1984 – Shining World
 1984 – Fire Road
 1985 – Battle of Moscow
 1987 – The Garden of Desires
 1989 – The Criminal Quartet
 1990 – Nicknamed The Beast 
 1992 – Stalin
 1995 – Bullet to Beijing
 1995 – Midnight in Saint Petersburg
 1997 – The Saint
 2001 – Again We Must Live
 2002 – The Sum of All Fears
 2002 – K-19: The Widowmaker - General Vershinin
 2002 – Master Spy: The Robert Hanssen Story 
 2002 – Drongo
 2002 –  Stereoblood
 2003 – Operational Alias
 2003 – The Burning Land
 2005 – Brezhnev
 2005 – Archangel
 2005 – KGB in a Tuxedo
 2008 – And Yet I Love...
 2008 – Streetracers
 2008 – Indigo
 2009 – Forbidden Reality
 2013 – World War III
 2015 – Londongrad
 2015 – Dukhless 2
 2019  – Dead Lake

References

External links

 Lev Prygunov online kinopoisk.ru
 Lev Prygunov online ruskino.ru

1939 births
Living people
People from Almaty
Soviet male film actors
Soviet male television actors
Soviet male stage actors
Russian male film actors
Russian male television actors
Russian male stage actors
20th-century Russian male actors
21st-century Russian male actors
Russian State Institute of Performing Arts alumni
Honored Artists of the RSFSR
People's Artists of Russia